A list of the films produced in Mexico in 1967 (see 1967 in film):

1967

External links

1967
Films
Lists of 1967 films by country or language